The Incredible Machine is a puzzle video game series about building Rube Goldberg devices.

The Incredible Machine may also refer to:
 The Incredible Machine (video game), the first entry in the series
 Man: The Incredible Machine, a 1975 documentary film
 The Incredible Machine (album), a 2010 album by the band Sugarland